Maricel Soriano (born Maria Cecilia Dador Soriano; February 25, 1965) is a Filipino film and television actress, occasional host and dancer. With a career spanning of over 50 years, Soriano is one of the most celebrated artists and popularly referred to as “The Diamond Star” for her acting prowess, talent and popularity.

Dubbed as the “Taray Queen” for her characteristically frank, street-smart, and quick-witted style, Soriano is the second Filipino actress with the most best-actress wins this century across the five biggest film awards ceremony. Tatler Asia ranked her as the 5th Top Veteran Actress of the Philippines, calling her “arguably the best actress of her time.” She has won over 40 best-actress wins throughout her career, becoming one of the most respected and illuminating artists in Philippine showbiz. Soriano is also recognised as the “Drama Anthology Queen” for the success of her two headlining drama series — Maricel Regal Drama Special (1987-1990) and The Maricel Drama Special (1990-1997), which had a ten-year run in the television altogether and became one of the longest running TV anthology series in Philippine history.

Soriano is also a Hall of Famer at MMFF Best Actress category. In 2018, she was awarded with a 'Film Icon Award' at Eddy Awards. She has won 5 FAMAS Awards including 2 Best Actress wins and a Dolphy Memorial Award for her contributions to Philippine comedy films. Soriano was recognized by FAMAS as one of the 'Iconic Movie Queens of Philippine Cinema.' In 2006, Soriano was inducted in Philippine Eastwood City Walk of Fame. In a poll conducted by S Magazine, she was voted as one of the 15 Greatest Actresses Of Philippine Cinema, with film genres ranging from comedy, fantasy, horror, suspense to action, romance, and drama.

Manila Bulletin hailed Maricel Soriano (together with Nora Aunor, Vilma Santos & Sharon Cuneta) as the Big 4 of the Philippine film industry or the “last four universally accepted Philippine movie queens.” Soriano is best known for her iconic, critically acclaimed and classic films including: Soltera, Saan Darating ang Umaga?, Inagaw mo ang Lahat sa Akin, Minsan Lang kita Iibigin and Separada to name a few.

Biography
Dubbed 'The Diamond Star' in the Philippine entertainment industry with 108 movies and several television awards (including Best Child Actress, Best Supporting Actress, Achiever Award as actress/producer, Best Performer and Best Actress) from various award-giving bodies such as FAMAS, PMPC, Empress, FAP, YCC, Pasado, GMMSFP, MMFF, Manila, Iloilo and Cinemanila Film Festivals. She was also known as 'Taray Queen' for her feisty roles in movies, where she's usually loud and energetic at the same time.

Soriano started acting at the age of six in the 1971 film My Heart Belongs to Daddy with Tirso Cruz III and fellow child actress Snooky Serna. She was brought by her paternal grandmother to Sampaguita Pictures search for a child actress who will portray Tirso Cruz, III's younger sister. With her dancing, singing and acting skills, she grabbed the part.

Soriano developed her comic skills under the guidance of the veteran comedians Dolphy and Nida Blanca, both of whom she considered second parents, especially when she grew up acting in John en Marsha where she was a regular cast.

In the 1980s, she was launched to full stardom as one of the Regal Babies along with Snooky Serna, Dina Bonnevie, Gabby Concepcion, Albert Martinez, Alfie Anido, Jimi Melendez and her loveteam partner, William Martinez. Her 1985 film Hinugot sa Langit, produced by Regal Films and directed by national artist Ishmael Bernal, is now considered one of the classics of Philippine cinema.

She was also named as "Drama Anthology Queen" in the early 1990s because of her successful weekly drama show (produced by Regal Films and ABS-CBN) topped the primetime ratings game since its airing in October 1986. In July 1988, Freddie M. Garcia acknowledged that Soriano was the number one star of ABS-CBN, of which he was then the general manager. After two years, she with sister Maria Victoria and former manager Manny Valera established Excellent Productions and took the helm of producing the show. The drama show lasted for ten years and was awarded by the Catholic Mass Media Awards in 1988 and 1989 and the KBP's Golden Dove Media Awards in 1992 and 1993 as outstanding drama anthology. As main performer, she received Star Award's best actress for drama honors in 1988, 1989 and 1992.

In September 2009, Soriano appeared in Florinda, the third and final episode of Sineserye Presents: The Susan Roces Cinema Collection.

In 2010, Soriano was now a freelancer and guested in Pilyang Kerubin, her comeback on GMA-7, where she played a mother who gives to her children; this was her first show on the channel.

In 2014, she inked a program contract with her home station, GMA Network, after backing out of ABS-CBN's Bukas na Lang Kita Mamahalin, which was supposed to be her teleserye comeback but Dawn Zulueta eventually replaced her role in the said show. She starred as Millet Gonzales-Real in Ang Dalawang Mrs. Real, her first major project as a Kapuso actress which also marked her return on the small screen and then did guesting in Bubble Gang and Sunday PinaSaya.

In 2017, she eventually returned to showbiz through her former home network, ABS-CBN.

Television

From the sitcom John en Marsha, she also starred in Kaluskos Musmos and Kuskos Balungos, youth oriented programs in the 1970s. She has appeared in musical variety shows (Maria! Maria!, "I M Wat I M" Maricel Live!), a drama anthology (Maricel Drama Special), comedy shows (2+2, Kaya ni Mister, Kaya ni Misis, Mary D' Potter, Bida si Mister, Bida si Misis), soap operas (Vietnam Rose, Florinda, Ang Dalawang Mrs. Real  The General's Daughter and City Hunter War of Life ) and John en Shirley (a spin-off of her original sitcom), where she is reunited with Dolphy and Susan Roces.

She has received two awards from the Asian TV Awards as Best Actress in a Comedy Show aside from her two awards for the same category from the Philippine Movie Press Club (PMPC). The PMPC honored her with six awards as Best Actress in a Drama Anthology (The Maricel Soriano Drama Special) in 1988, 1989 and 1992 and Best Actress for Drama in a Soap Opera (Vietnam Rose) 2006 and (Florinda) 2010 and Best Actress for Drama in Single Performance (MMK – Baso episode) in 2017.

The Society of Entertainment (Enpress) thru their Golden Screen Awards for TV, the OFW Kakampi Awards and the EduKCircle TV Awards gave her the Best Actress for Drama trophies for her compelling performance in GMA Network's Ang Dalawang Mrs. Real.

Her appeal to consumers help catapult a number of products (and infomercial) to gain a sizable share of the market, most notably: Ever Gotesco Malls, Modess, Green Cross Alcohol & Soap, Whisper, Alaska, Globe, Swift Spaghetti & Corned Beef, Loviscol, McDonald's, Jollibee, Mr. Clean, Breeze, Minola, Fiesta Spaghetti, Golden Fiesta Cooking Oil, Aji Ginisa, Vaseline shampoo, Argentina Corned Beef, DOH's Newborn Screening, Quick Chow Noodles and Saucy Me.

Her TVC with Jollibee in the mid-90s with Cesar Montano, made the catch phrase, "Correct ka dyan" famous. As well as, the strong line, "Ang mikrobyo hindi bine-beybi, pinapatay!" for Green Cross Alcohol in 1998. Same thing with the catchphrase, "Mauulit ito, Madalas!" with Mcdonalds Hamburger TVC during the mid-90s. She is formerly signed to GMA Network and is currently under Viva Artist Agency and ABS-CBN.

Film

Soriano has appeared in numerous comedy films, from John en Marsha in 1973 to I Will Survive in 2004. Some of her films are now considered classics, most notable of which are Saan Darating ang Umaga? (1983), Kaya Kong Abutin ang Langit (1984), Hinugot sa Langit (1985), Pinulot Ka Lang sa Lupa (1987), Babaing Hampaslupa (1988), Ikaw Pa Lang ang Minahal (1992), Harvest Home (1995), Abot Kamay ang Pangarap (1996) (The Philippine entry to the Oscar Awards), Soltera (1999), Mila (2001), Filipinas (2003) and Inang Yaya (2006). Her action-oriented films with action superstars are all certified hits starting with the record-breaking Batang Quiapo (1986) until her last in 1998's Sige, Subukan Mo.

Soriano is also considered the 'Dancing Queen' of the 1980s, and her signature dance numbers, "I Am What I Am", "Body Dancer", "Rico Mambo, Angela Clemmons' "Give Me Just a Little More Time" and Shalamar's "A Night to Remember", among others have continued to be associated with her even to this very day. While not a professional singer, she even managed to record two songs, the theme song of the movie, Oh, My Mama! and the gold record hit "Ngayon at Habang Panahon". Aside from a sold out concert at the Smart Araneta Coliseum entitled "Hello, Hello Maricel" in 1987, she has appeared in hit concerts locally and abroad in the late 1980s and early 1990s.

With her film output already reaching the millennium mark and a range of films unsurpassed by all other actresses, she is one of the few bestowed by filmdom with this title. The Diamond Star has practically worked in all the major film outfits in the industry, appeared with every major star, and set acting standards and box office records.

She is the third most awarded film actress of all time with over 50 plus accolades (child, supporting and lead actress) trophies to boost from various legitimate award giving bodies such as FAMAS, PMPC, Empress, FAP, YCC, Pasado, GMMSFP, MMFF, Manila, Iloilo and Cinemanila Film Festivals. Aside from these, Soriano has received other acting awards from various sources such as fan magazine publishing companies and people's choice awards.

In 2006, Soriano was back with Regal Films as the lead star of Bahay Kubo, a movie intended for the 2007 Metro Manila Film Festival.

Personal life
Maricel Soriano was born in Pasay to Linda Dador and Victor Soriano. Her family initially lived in Makati and she and her sister, Maria Victoria "Becbec" attended St. Mary's Academy of Pasay for their grade school education. When her family transferred to Kamuning, Quezon City, she continued schooling at Trinity University of Asia (then College), CEU High School and OB Montessori. Due to her hectic showbiz schedule, she was unable to finish her secondary education. Based on her previous interviews, she said that 'if she did not become a movie star, she probably would have been a stewardess or a teacher.' However, she is computer-literate and adept at designing accessories, T-shirts, cards, certificates and stationeries. She even designed the graphics and title credits at the start and end of her drama anthology.

From their rented house in Kamuning, Quezon City, she lived independently by getting a townhouse in Midland Manor in Greenhills, San Juan, while her mother and siblings rented a house in Xavierville, Q.C. near Katipunan Road. When her house was finally completed in White Plains, Quezon City in 1985, she moved in together with her son, Marron Soriano. She married Edu Manzano in 1989 and joined him in Makati, but later went back to White Plains. When she gave birth to Sebastien Soriano, her mother and brothers joined her in White Plains. She briefly had her own condo in Rockwell, Makati with Eric Quizon as neighbor. Presently, she stays in Greenhills, San Juan with her two sons.

As a businesswoman, she and her sister with erstwhile manager Manny Valera established Excellent Productions in 1990, but was later renamed Diamond Star Productions, Inc. taking over the weekly production of her TV drama show when Regal Films decided to discontinue. It was renamed "The Maricel Soriano Drama Special" with her sister as Executive Producer and Maricel as Line Producer. The same production outfit was responsible for TV sitcoms -"Kaya ni Mister, Kaya ni Misis", "Mary D'Potter" and "Bida si Mister, Bida si Misis" and the film Kung Kaya Mo, Kaya Ko Rin (1996) with Cesar Montano. She also opened a sing-along bar, Mr. Melody, in Quezon City and Diamond Star Records.

In showbiz, she lists co-actors Roderick Paulate and Jackie Lou Blanco as her best friends. Other personalities whom she was very close with were King of Comedy, Dolphy and versatile actress, Nida Blanca (whom she considered as second parents); dramatic actress Charito Solis; comedian Nova Villa; producer and actress Armida Siguion-Reyna, actor Eric Quizon, make-up artist James Cooper; talent manager Anthony "Tonet Macho" Roquel; and award-winning actresses Gina Alajar, Jacklyn Jose and Rosanna Roces.

She was married to Edu Manzano from 1989 to 1991 and maintains friendly relations with him. Aside from her sister, who is the mother of award-winning actress Meryll Soriano, her siblings include Michael "Mykee" Martinez and movie/TV actor and entrepreneur Melchor "Mel" Martinez.

Discography

Soriano recorded a few songs in the 1980s including the gold single "Ngayon at Habang Panahon" penned by Tito Sotto and the theme song of her movie Oh, My Mama! in 1981.

Filmography

Film

Television

Awards and nominations
Soriano has received a number of awards, most notable of which are the two Asian TV Awards as Best Comedy Actress, and three FAP awards, three FAMAS and five PMPC Star Awards for her drama performances. In 1974, she received her first award as Best Child Actress at the age of nine at the 9th Metro Manila Film Festival for Virgo Film's Alaala mo, Daigdig ko ("Your Memory is My World"). She won her second acting award at the 1974 Ilo-ilo Film Festival for the movie version of the TV sitcom John En Marsha which later became the longest-running Philippine sitcom. She received four consecutive nominations for FAMAS Awards in the years 1994, 1995, 1996 and 1997. Her 1995 film, Inagaw Mo Ang Lahat sa Akin, produced by Reyna films was the official Philippine entry to the 1996 Oscar awards. In 1999, she was named as one of the Top 100 Stars of Philippine Cinema All-Time by Manila Times and in 2005 she was listed by the Director's Guild of the Philippines as one of the Top 15 Best Actresses of All Time. On January 5, 2008, she won the Best Actress award for Bahay Kubo at the Metro Manila Film Festival; this is her 3rd Best Actress prior to 1997's Nasaan ang Puso and 2003's Filipinas. Soriano also won in the 38th Box Office Queen and King Entertainment Awards as Film Actress of the Year for her performance in A Love Story.

International awards

Ref:

Local awards

ref:

ref:

Other awards

Asia Television Awards (International)
Asia Television Awards - Best Drama Actress for the Maricel Soriano Drama Special (first runner-up) 1997 
Asia Television Awards - Best Comedy Actress for "Kaya ni Mister, Kaya ni Misis" (winner) 1998
Asia Television Awards - Best Comedy Actress for "Kaya ni Mister, Kaya ni Misis"(winner) 1999

Film and Television Achievement Awards
Entertainment Press of the Philippines (Enpress) Icon Awardee (one of the 13 awardees) -2010
FAMAS' Iconic Movie Queens of Philippine Cinema Awardee −2015
FAMAS' Dolphy King of Comedy Awardee −2019
PMPC's Ading Fernando Lifetime Achievement Award for Television – 2016
Society of Philippine Entertainment Editors (SPEED) EDDY's Film Icon Awardee – 2018
8th EdukCircle Awards – Best Actress in A Single Performance for MMK's "Baso" – 2018
44th Metro Manila Film Festival Awards – Hall of Fame for Best Actress (Five Award-Winning Performances)– 2019

PASADO Awards
Best Actress 1999, Soltera
Best Actress 2006, Inang Yaya

Gawad TANGLAW Awards
Achiever's Award for Producer and Actress 2006, Inang Yaya

People's Choice Awards
Best Actress 1992, Ikaw Pa lang ang Minahal
Best Actress 1994, Separada

GMMSF Box-Office Entertainment Awards
Teen-age Box-Office Queen 1983 "Saan Darating ang Umaga? " “Ang Boyfriend kong Kano", "Summer Holiday"
Teen-age Box-Office Queen 1984 "Kaya kong Abutin ang Langit", "Anak ni Waray vs AnaK ni Biday", "Teenage Marriage" 
Ms. RP Movies 1985 "Inday Bote”
Ms. RP Movies 1986 "Batang Quiapo" “Inday, Inday sa Balitaw" “Horsey, Horsey Tigidig Tigidig”
Ms. RP Movies 1994, "Separada"
Ms. RP Movies 1999, "Soltera”
Ms. RP Movies 2004, Filipinas
Film Actress of the Year 2007, Inang Yaya
Film Actress of the Year 2008, A Love Story
Film Actress of the Year 2014, Girl, Boy, Bakla, Tomboy

Manila Film Festival
Best Child Actress 1974, Alaala Mo, Daigdig Ko

Iloilo Film Festival
Best Child Actress 1974, John en Marsha

TV awards

OFW Kakampi Awards 
2015 BEST ACTRESS Ang Dalawang MRS. REAL

ENPRESS Golden Screen TV Awards
2015 Outstanding Performance by an Actress in a Drama Program : Ang Dalawang Mrs. Real

PMPC Star Awards for TV

Nominated
28th PMPC Star Awards for TV Best Drama Actress || Ang Dalawang Mrs. Real

28th PMPC Star Awards for TV Best Actress in a single performance Kulungan Kanlungan

27th PMPC Star Awards for TV Best Actress in a single performance Baldadong Puso

PMPC Star Awards for TV Best Actress in a single performance MMK: Sing-along Bar

5th Best Drama Actress for TV Best Drama Actress || Maricel Regal Drama Special and Maricel Soriano Drama Special

Won
1988 PMPC Star Awards Best Actress For Drama Maricel Regal Drama Special
1989 PMPC Star Awards Best Actress For Drama Maricel Regal Drama Special
1997 PMPC Star Awards Best Actress For Drama The Maricel Soriano Drama Special
2006 PMPC Star Awards Best Drama Actress for Vietnam Rose
2010 PMPC Star Awards Best Drama Actress for Florinda"
2017 PMPC Star Awards Best Actress in a Single Performance MMK "Baso"

Golden Dove Awards
1990 Golden Dove Awards Best Drama Show Maricel Regal Drama Special
1991 Golden Dove Awards Best Drama Show Maricel Regal Drama Special

CMMA Awards
1983 CMMA 1st Runner-up Best Supporting Actress for Saan Darating Ang Umaga?
1988 CMMA Awards Best Drama Show Maricel Regal Drama Special
1989 CMMA Awards Best Drama Show Maricel Regal Drama Special

Record awards and concerts
1982: "Ngayon at Habang Panahon" (Gold single)
1982: "Oh My Mama"
1985: Theme from Inday Bote, Karitong Paikot-ikot, I Am What I Am
1985: "John en Marsha sa America Show" in LA, San Francisco, Winnipeg Canada, Toronto Canada
1986: Sung "Mahal na Mahal Kita" in Horsey Horsey Tigidig Tigidig
1986: Sung "Kahit Na" in Batang Quiapo
1986: "Hello Hello Maricel" (also sang a duet with Raymond Lauchengco, the theme of their movie Saan Darating Ang Umaga?)
1987: Maricel and Roderick concert in Japan, Hong Kong and Singapore

Entertainment and industry awards

1981: Regal Most Popular Loveteam with William Martinez for Oh my Mama
1982: Regal Most Popular Loveteam with William Martinez for Galawgaw at Pabling
1983: Regal Most Popular Loveteam with William Martinez for Hindi Kita Malimot, Summer Love
1982: Regal Teenage Movie Queen
1983: Regal Teenage Movie Queen
1983: GMMFSA Teenage Movie Queen
1984: Regal Teenage Movie Queen
1984: GMMFSA Teenage Movie Queen
1983: Regal No. 1 Bankable Star
1984: Regal No. 1 Bankable Star
1985: Regal No. 1 Bankable Star
1985: GMMFSA Ms. RP Movies
1986: Regal No. 1 Bankable Star
1987: Regal No. 1 Bankable Star
1988: Regal No. 1 Bankable Star
1989: Regal No. 1 Bankable Star
1986: Regal Box Office Queen
1987: Regal Box Office Queen
1988: Regal Box Office Queen
1989: Regal Box Office Queen
1988: Regal Best Citation for Maricel in her 17 years in showbiz
1988: Philippines TV Drama Anthology Queen By Inquirer
1988: Philippines Box Office Queen By Inquirer
1989: PHILIPPINES TV Drama Anthology Queen By Inquirer
1987: Box office Queen Kislap Magazine
1988: Box Office Queen Kislap Magazine
1988: TV's Drama Queen Kislap Magazine
1989: TV's Drama Queen Kislap Magazine
1989: TV's Drama Queen Abante Tonight
1988: Box Office Queen By Manila Bulletin
1988: Philippines TV Drama Anthology Queen By Manila Bulletin
1988: TV's Drama Queen by Tempo
1988: TV's Drama Queen by People's News
1987: Most Popular Female Star Sensation Magazine
1988: Most Popular Female Star Sensation Magazine
1987: Box Office Queen Sensation Magazine
1988: Box Office Queen Sensation Magazine
1987: TV's Drama Queen Sensation Magazine
1988: TV's Drama Queen Sensation Magazine
1987: Most Popular Female Commediene Sensation Magazine
1988: Most Popular Female Commediene Sensation Magazine
1988: Most Popular Loveteam Maricel Soriano and Eric Quizon for Super Inday Sensation Magazine
1989: Most Popular Female Star by Woman Today
1989: Taray Queen Chika Chika Magazine
1989: Box Office Queen by Woman Today
1989: Screen Diva By Woman Today
1989: Anthology Queen By Woman Today
1989: Woman of the Year By Woman's Magazine
1987: Most Popular Female Star Orig Magazine
1987: Box Office Superstar Orig Magazine
1988: Most Popular Female star Orig Magazine
1987: TV's Queen of Drama Orig Magazine
1987: Female Star of the year Flash Magazine
1988: Most Popular Loveteam Maricel Soriano and Randy Santiago For Taray at Teroy Flash Magazine
1988: Female Star of the Year Tiktik Tabloid
1988: No. 1 Box Office Star Flash Magazine
1989: One of the seven outstanding actresses of the Philippines Movie Flash
1987: Cinema Scoop TV's Drama Queen
1988: Cinema Scoop Female Star
1988: Cinema Scoop TV's Drama Queen
1988: Cinema Scoop Female Star
1986: GMMFSA Ms. RP Movies
1988: GMMFSA Ms. RP Movies
1989: GMMFSA Ms. RP Movies
1988: Regal Drama Anthology Queen
1989: Regal Drama Anthology Queen
1990: Regal Drama Anthology Queen
1991: REGAL Drama Anthology Queen
1992: Regal Drama Anthology Queen
1987: Box Office Queen Jingle Extra Hot
1987: Most Popular Female Star Jingle Extra Hot
1987: Most Popular Commediene Jingle Extra Hot
1988: Box Office Queen Jingle Extra Hot
1988: TV'S Queen of Drama Jingle Extra Hot
1988: Most Popular Female Star Jingle Extra Hot
1988: FAP LUNA Awards Star of the night
1988: Metro Manila Film Festival Star of the Night
1988: ABS-CBN Cited Maricel for her 17 years in Showbiz
1988: ABS-CBN Box Office Superstar
1988: ABS-CBN Consummate Artist
1988: ABS-CBN Drama Anthology Queen
1989: ABS-CBN Drama Anthology Queen
1990: ABS-CBN Drama Anthology Queen
1991: ABS-CBN Drama Anthology Queen
1991: ABS-CBN Cited Maricel for her 22 years in Showbiz
1994: GMMFS Box-Office Entertainment Awards|Guillermo Memorial Mendoza Scholarship Foundation Awards Ms. RP Movies
1999: One of the Top 100 Stars of Philippine Cinema, Manila Times
2000: Chosen as one of Philippines Best Actresses Critics
2003: GMSFF Ms. RP Movies
2006: GMMFSA Ms. RP Movies
2003: Most Popular Female Star Yes Magazine
2003: Female Actress of the Year Yes Magazine
2004: Most Popular Female Star Yes Magazine
2004: Female Actress of the year Yes Magazine
2005: Most Popular Female Star Yes Magazine
2005: Female Actress of the Year Yes Magazine
2006: Most Popular Female Star Yes Magazine
2006: Female Actress of the Year Yes Magazine
2006: Scene Stealer Yes Magazine
2006: Most Beautiful Celebrity Yes Magazine
2007: Hall of Famer Female Actress of the Year Yes Magazine
2007: Hall of Famer Most Popular Female Star Yes Magazine
2005: One of Top 15 Best Actress of all-time in Philippine Cinema by Directors Guild
1992: Grand Slam Nominations for Best Actress in Ikaw Pa lang ang Minahal
1995: Grand Slam Nominations for Best Actress in Dahas
1999: Grand Slam Nominations for Best Actress in Soltera
2003: Grand Slam Nominations for Best Actress in Filipinas
2006: Grand slam Nominations For Best Actress in Inang Yaya
2006: One of the TOP Choice for the 15 greatest actresses in Philippine Cinema S Magazine
2006: Top Female Celebrity Pex
2006: One of Best Dressed Actress Pex
2003: No. 1 Star Filmbug
2004: No. 1 Star Filmbug
2005: No. 1 Star Filmbug
2006: No. 1 Star Filmbug
2007: No. 1 Star Filmbug
2007: One of S magazine Best Dressed Female star
2007: One of the Top Ten Best actresses in YCC
2008: Female Actress of the year Yes Magazine
2008: One of 100 Most Beautiful People By Yes Magazine
2008: No. 1 Star Filmbug
2009: No. 1 Star Filmbug
2009: One of the best dressed celebrity from preview magazine
2010: No. 1 Star Filmbug
2010: One of the Best Actresses of the Decade (2000–2009)
One of the 15 Cinema One Legends
One of the Top 7 Celebrity Icons (with Dolphy, Sharon Cuneta, Vilma Santos, Gloria Romero, Judy Ann Santos and Lea Salonga)
Philippine Paradise of Stars
Philippine Walk of Fame
Most Powerful Personality in Showbiz
1999: The 15 Brightest Stars in Philippine Showbiz
2003: BizNewsAsia's list of Top 100 Most Powerful Filipinos for 2002.
2005: One of 15 Greatest Actresses Of Phil.Cinema (Yes Magazine)
2006: One of 15 Greatest Actresses Of Phil.Cinema (S-Magazine)
2007: One of YES! 100 Most Beautiful Stars
2008: One of YES! 100 Most Beautiful Stars
2009: One of YES! 100 Most Beautiful Stars
2012: Most Beautiful Female Star Over 35 Female Network
2013: Most Inspiring Filipina Character in Inang Yaya as Norma for Female Network
2013: Best Actress Enpress Awards Gallery of Distinction Dekada AWARD
2015: 6th ENPRESS Golden TV Screen Awards Outstanding Performance by An Actress in a Drama Program Ang Dalawang Mrs. Real
2018: Eddy's Icon Awardee

2022: 6th Outstanding Men and Women -Awardee

References

External links

1965 births
Living people
20th-century Filipino actresses
21st-century Filipino actresses
ABS-CBN personalities
Filipino child actresses
20th-century Filipino women singers
Filipino film actresses
Filipino television actresses
Filipino women comedians
GMA Network personalities
People from Manila
Radio Philippines Network personalities
Actresses from Metro Manila